Randy Fabi (born 1963 in Regina, Saskatchewan) is a former professional Canadian football player.

Early years
Randy Fabi is the son of Transylvanian Saxons immigrants, CFL player Martin Fabi and Katherine Mergler. He grew up in Aylmer, Ontario and attended Oakville Trafalgar High School in Oakville, Ontario.

Fabi played for the Western Mustangs football team at the University of Western Ontario.

Professional career 
Following in his father's footsteps, Randy Fabi played in the Canadian Football League from 1986 to 1991. He played with the Winnipeg Blue Bombers from the 1986 CFL season to 1990, including winning the 76th Grey Cup in 1988. He played for the Hamilton Tiger-Cats for the 1991 CFL season.

References 

1963 births
Living people
Players of Canadian football from Saskatchewan
Players of Canadian football from Ontario
Winnipeg Blue Bombers players
Hamilton Tiger-Cats players
Sportspeople from Regina, Saskatchewan
Western Mustangs football players
Canadian people of Romanian descent